Liberty Oradea was a Romanian football club from Pomezeu, Bihor County, founded in 2003 and dissolved in 2017.

The club last played in the Liga V in the 2016–17 season.

History

At the end of the 2005–06 season it promoted for the very first time in its history to the Liga I, after only 3 years of existence. But it never had a chance to play there, because it sold its place to UTA Arad.

In its last years the club could be seen playing constantly in the Liga IV, as Liberty Oradea, but the club was relocated from Salonta to Pomezeu. In the summer of 2017 the club was dissolved and the old club of Pomezeu, Vida was refounded.

Stadium
The club used to play its home matches on Stadionul Liberty in Salonta, but after the relocation, the club played its home matches on Stadionul Pomezeu in Pomezeu.

Honours
Liga II:
Winners (1): 2005–06

Liga III:
Winners (1): 2006–07

Notable former players
The footballers enlisted below have had international cap(s) for their respective countries at junior and/or senior level. Players whose name is listed in bold represented their countries at junior and/or senior level on through the time's passing. These players have also had a significant number of caps and goals accumulated throughout a certain number of seasons for the club itself as well.

Romania
  Cristian Bălgrădean
  Cristian Bud
  Cristian Cigan
  Andrei Coroian
  Cristian Danci
  Sergiu Homei
  Adrian Mărkuș
  Laurențiu Rus
  Bogdan Străuț
  George Pușcaș

Hungary
  Bálint Bajner
  Iván Balaskó
  Gábor Demjén
  Pál Lázár
  Tamás Takács

Ghana
  William Amamoo

References

External links
Official website

Defunct football clubs in Romania
Football clubs in Bihor County
Association football clubs established in 2003
Association football clubs disestablished in 2017
2003 establishments in Romania
2017 disestablishments in Romania
Liga II clubs
Liga III clubs
Liga IV clubs